Both the Ukrainian Autonomous Republic of Crimea and the Russian Republic of Crimea use the same coat of arms, which has been in use since 1992.

Description
The coat of arms consists of a red Varangian shield and a silver griffin passant facing to the heraldic right with an azure pearl in its right paw. On either sides of the shield are a white pillar. At the top of the shield sits the rising sun. Winding around both columns and under the shield rests the Flag of Crimea, a blue–white–red tricolor ribbon, unto which the Motto of Crimea, Процветание в единстве (translated as Prosperity in unity), is inscribed.

The Varangian shield is symbolic of the fact that the region of Crimea was for a long time a crossing of major trade routes. The red field of the coat of arms symbolizes the intense history of Crimea. The griffin is placed on the coat of arms because it is commonly used to represent the territory north of the Black Sea, and is known as the "coat of arms" of Chersonesos and Panticapaeum, where one can see the griffin on artifacts from the area.

Another variation in the symbolism is that the pearl is symbolic of Crimea as a part of Earth, and the griffin as the defender of the young republic. The pearl's azure is reminiscent of the combined culture of Crimea. The white pillars are said to be reminiscent of the ancient civilizations which inhabited the peninsula. The rising sun is symbolic of prosperity and regeneration.

Historical coats of arms

See also
 Flag of Crimea

Notes

References

External links

 Ukrainian heraldry — Coat of arms of Crimea 

Crimea
Symbols of Crimea
Crimea
Crimea
Crimea
Crimea